Ann Curtis is a swimmer.

Ann or Anne Curtis may also refer to:

Ann Curtis (writer) known as Ann of Swansea
Ann Curtis (costume designer)
Anne Curtis, actress and presenter